The list of ship launches in 1889 includes a chronological list of some ships launched in 1889.

References 

Sources

1889
 
1889 in transport